No soy monedita de oro ("I Am Not a Gold Coin") is a 1959 Mexican film. It was directed by Chano Urueta.

Cast
 Armando Arriola
 Fernando Casanova		
 Daniel 'Chino' Herrera		
 Mary López		
 Lucha Moreno		
 Óscar Ortiz de Pinedo		
 Cuco Sánchez

External links
 
 .

1959 films
Mexican adventure comedy-drama films
1950s Spanish-language films
Films directed by Chano Urueta
1950s Mexican films